Tamsyn Challenger is a British artist, curator and lecturer.

Her work focuses on wide-ranging socio- and gender-political ideas including precursor work on selfie culture, and questioning the ‘free’ environment online along with a continued scrutiny of social media, truth and identity.

She is known for her gender-political work 400 Women, which took five years to create and comprises portraits by nearly 200 artists, including Maggi Hambling, Paula Rego, Zoe Laughlin and Celia Paul.

Challenger studied at Winchester School of Art and at the University for the Creative Arts (formerly Kent Institute of Art and Design) where she has subsequently been a visiting lecturer. Her sister is the author Melanie Challenger.

Exhibited across the UK and internationally, Challenger has been an invited speaker at the Women Of The World Festival, UAL, RHUL, Glasgow, Oxford and Cambridge Universities. She has made a documentary for the BBC, My Male Muse, with poet Clare Pollard being chosen for Radio 4's "Pick of the Year". In 2017, she was invited to deliver the David Vilaseca Memorial Lecture at Royal Holloway University. After this lecture she was appointed a member of the Advisory Committee for the Centre of Visual Cultures at Royal Holloway.

Work 

Challenger's first solo show was The Tamsynettes at Transition Gallery run by Cathy Lomax in Bethnal Green in March 2010. This is an ongoing work looking at stylised layers of beauty through mapping her corporeal deterioration over the course of her lifetime. The Tamsynettes yr 2 was shown as part of the Beaconsfield (Vauxhall, London) show Fraternise-the Salon in May 2011, showing alongside Tracey Emin, Franko B, Damien Hirst, Mark Wallinger and Sarah Lucas, among others.

In 2006, Challenger began developing the idea for 400 Women. Politically concerned with gender violence, 400 Women began for Challenger when she visited Mexico in 2006 and is focused on the murdered and missing women of Juarez (see Female homicides in Ciudad Juárez). Challenger brought together a critical mass of nearly 200 international artists including Maggi Hambling, Paula Rego, Zoe Laughlin and Celia Paul to address issues of mortality and the capacity of art to imagine the dead, violence and trauma, with the aim of re-personalising the individual from a statistic.

The show premiered in November 2010 at Shoreditch Town Hall Basement space, London, supported by the Arts Council and Amnesty International. The site-specific installation was subsequently selected as part of the Edinburgh Art Festival 2011. 400 Women continues to tour internationally.

In 2012 Challenger was invited to contribute to a new protest book in conjunction with Pussy Riot that was published by Rough Trade Records, Let's Start A Pussy Riot. She was one of several contributors including Yoko Ono, Judy Chicago, Carolee Schneemann and several rock and punk musicians. Challenger was the only artist to produce a new sculptural work for the book which consists of a highly coloured fully operational ducking stool, shown as a precursor work to Monoculture.

From June 2012 – February 2013, Challenger was in residence at Beaconsfield Gallery BAW in London under the curatorial direction of David Crawforth and Naomi Siderfin, where she began exploring cultural homogeneity and the "selfie" portrait through her project Monoculture.

In February 2013, Monoculture show premiered at Beaconsfield and consisted of new large scale sculptural works that explore the relationship between social media, sexuality and self-representation. The work was recommended by the Contemporary Art Society in April 2013. This work was supported by the Arts Council.

Monoculture was then shown as part of the Edinburgh Art Festival 2014, where it has been described by the New Scientist as "mesmerising and horrifying in equal measure".

Her project Twitter Chorus was a further development taken from the ideas behind Monoculture and was voiced for the first time in England in 2015 at the Southbank Centre. It was subsequently performed at the New Hall Art Collection, MEC, Cambridge University in November 2015 with anarchic performance group Gaggle. In March 2016 this work was staged on a dramatic scale with hundreds of voices from multiple choirs as part of the Chorus Festival, Southbank Centre.

In 2016 she returned to Summerhall with her new work HYPER BOWL, which was developed and shown for their visual art festival programme, and written up in The Times as "the paramount, walk-in art for the age of Trump".

Free The Pussy! was Challenger's first curatorial exhibition, shown first at Summerhall alongside Pussy Riot's performance residency "Riot Days" during the Edinburgh Festival 2018.

She made a series of new "curatorial" interventions including the controversial The Royal Pussy signage, Corridor Dancefloor and 40 second miaow clock. Challenger also collaborated with Yoko Ono in a reshaping text work of Ono's 1985 song ‘Hell In Paradise’ and with punk artist Jamie Reid to create Putin Trampoline, from his protest poster Free Pussy Riot.

She has recently been making a new body of work addressing female sexuality that sees a departure from previous projects. The series Before you. With you. After you. is confessional and personal, and draws upon her own recent history.

The first sculpture of this series, Empty Nest, was unveiled ahead of her David Vilaseca Lecture entitled On Truth and displayed as part of the collection in the Royal Holloway University Picture Gallery.

Curatorial 

In 2018, Challenger curated her first exhibition, Free The Pussy!, which sprang out of her previous association with Pussy Riot. The exhibition was predominantly made up of archive work from 2012, when the "Riot" sent out their call to arms to the creative community; some of this work was also featured in the book Let's Start a Pussy Riot.

Artists featured in the Free The Pussy! exhibition were No Bra, Judy Chicago, Challenger herself, Billy Chyldish, Gaggle, Gera (Nadya Tolokonnikova's daughter), The Gluts, Hayley Newman, Yoko Ono, Miss Pokeno, Pussy Riot, Jamie Reid, John Keane, Layla Sailor, Wendy Saunders, Carolee Schneemann and Voina.

Media

Radio and television 

Tamsyn Challenger has written and produced programmes for BBC Radio 4 and BBC World Service, has been featured on BBC Two's The Review Show, BBC Two's Edinburgh Nights with Nish Kumar, BBC World Service Arts Hour, BBC Radio 4's Woman's Hour. Internationally, she has been featured on The Netherlands' Nieuwsuur and KRO De Wandeling.

 Critical comment 

"It feels important still to challenge the boundaries (literally) of what a gallery is — and that's something you did with the signage. I really think you created 'art' by 'transgressing' in that way, and though it felt depressing it was part of the challenge you set up by curating the show." – Joanna Walsh discussing Free The Pussy! for the LA Review of Books, 2019

"As a metaphor for the treatment of Pussy Riot, it's on the money." – Nadine McBay's appraisal of the "Ducking Stool" sculpture, The National, 2018

"Challenger's wry, playful but nevertheless piercing critique infiltrates hyperbolic language from the inside – this is what makes the bowl shape of her structure so interesting. Not only is it an echo chamber in which hyperbole resounds and reverberates, but it also physically manifests hyperbole's tendency towards totalising: literally enveloping and entrapping discourse." – Colin Herd for Aesthetica, 2016

"Brill" – Mary Beard commenting on The Love-Byte (part of Monoculture) via Twitter.

"Mesmerising and horrifying in equal measure." – Kat Austen writing on Monoculture for the New Scientist in 2014

"A few more shows of the calibre of Tamsyn Challenger's tribute to the victims of Mexico's drugs war would have given this year's Edinburgh Art Festival a much-needed sense of global urgency and energy... 400 Women...is like a bullet to the brain" – Moira Jeffrey writing on 400 Women, Scotland on Sunday, 2012

"Stalin said, one death is a tragedy, a million is a statistic. And what she's trying to do is retrieve the individual tragedies from the statistic. And to feel like you're being watched by these women'...'It's so good at locating both the individual and the wider picture..." – Johann Hari for BBC Two The Review Show'', 2010

References

Further reading 

 Interview with Studio International - Tamsyn Challenger: Free the Pussy! (Aug 2018)
 Interview with The List Magazine - Artist Tamsyn Challenger helps to Free The Pussy! (Aug 2018)
It's Nice That - A new exhibition called Free The Pussy! pays homage to Pussy Riot through curated artworks (July 2018)
 Tamsyn Challenger delivers the David Vilaseca Memorial Lecture (2017)
Interview with The List Magazine - Tamsyn Challenger to bring new show Monoculture to the 2014 Edinburgh Art Festival (July 2014)
Wild Culture Review – MONOCULTURE – TAMSYN CHALLENGER AT BEACONSFIELD by Tom Jeffries (Feb 2013)
400 Women – Tamsyn Challenger interview: Edinburgh Art Festival 2011 show inspired by tragic events by Kirstin Innes (The List, 2011)
 BBC - Artists' tribute to Mexico's missing and murdered women (2010)
Art Vehicle Interview with the artist Tamsyn Challenger by Ali MacGilp (2010)
 BBC Radio 4 Woman's Hour (2010)

External links 
Tamsyn Challenger official website

Living people
People from Penzance
English installation artists
English women artists
Alumni of the University for the Creative Arts
Year of birth missing (living people)